The cabinet of Egyptian Prime Minister Ibrahim Mahlab was sworn in on 17 June 2014. The cabinet is made up of 34 ministers.

Cabinet members

References

2014 establishments in Egypt
Cabinets of Egypt
Egypt, Cabinet
Cabinets established in 2014
2015 disestablishments in Egypt
Cabinets disestablished in 2015